Sergio Armando Marchant Muñoz (17 September 1961 – 15 May 2020) was a Chilean footballer who played as a midfielder.

References

1961 births
2020 deaths
Association football midfielders
Chilean footballers
Olympic footballers of Chile
Footballers at the 1984 Summer Olympics
C.D. Arturo Fernández Vial footballers
Deportes Antofagasta managers